During the 2002–2003 English football season, Queens Park Rangers F.C. competed in the Football League Second Division.

Final league table

Results

Legend

Football League Second Division

Playoffs

FA Cup

League Cup

LDV Vans Trophy

Players

First-team squad 
Squad at end of season

Left club during season

References

Notes 

Queens Park Rangers F.C. seasons
Queens Park Rangers F.C.